The Mohammad Ali Jinnah University, abbreviated as MAJU) is a private university located in Karachi, Sindh, Pakistan.

Established in 1998, the university offers undergraduate and post-graduate programs with a strong emphasis on business management, applied sciences, engineering and computer science.

Recognized university 
Recognized by the Higher Education Commission (Pakistan). 

In addition, the university is a member of the Association of Commonwealth Universities of the United Kingdom.

Additional campuses
The university operated an additional campus in Islamabad, but it changed into Capital University of Science & Technology (CUST) in 2015. Now CUST is separate from MAJU, Karachi and under the MAJU Trust.

History
The Punjab Group of Colleges has been serving the community with education since 1985.

As a tribute to the father of the Nation, the group named an ambitious project Mohammad Ali Jinnah University. Mohammad Ali Jinnah University was granted its charter by the government of Sindh in 1998. The Islamabad campus was established after obtaining an NOC from UGC, dated 17 August 1998 and dated 29 November 2001 and NOC from HEC dated 27 September 2003. (now become a separate university CUST Islamabad)

Academics 
MAJU has departments of Computer Science, Bioinformatics and Biosciences, Mathematics in the Faculty of Computing; in the Faculty of Business Administration and Social Sciences, there are departments of Business Administration, Economics and Social Sciences.

In addition to pure academic programs, MAJU runs training programs, seminars and workshops. The university has started doctoral programs in Computer Sciences, Electrical Engineering and Management Sciences.

A project of Punjab Group of Colleges. Research is another area of prime importance at MAJU. Research and Development are the crucial tools that countries use to transform their developing economies into developed nations. With advanced degree programs in Banking and Finance, Computer Science and Management Information Systems, we are preparing young men and women to meet the challenges of the new millennium.

See also
Punjab Group of Colleges
Punjab College of Business Administration
Punjab Law College
University of Central Punjab, Lahore
Capital University of Science & Technology, Islamabad

References

External links
 MAJU official website
 

Educational institutions established in 1998
Universities and colleges in Karachi
Punjab Group of Colleges
1998 establishments in Pakistan
Private universities and colleges in Sindh
Engineering universities and colleges in Pakistan
Memorials to Muhammad Ali Jinnah